Giampaolo Dolfin (1736-1819) was a Roman Catholic prelate who became Bishop of Bergamo from 1777 to 1819.

Life
Born in Sebenico (now Šibenik, Croatia), he joined the Canons Regular of the Lateran and in 1774 was appointed Bishop of Ceneda. Three years later, Pope Pius VI named him Bishop of Bergamo. In the first years of his tenure he tried to establish good relations with the Republic of Venice, the ruling power of the territory of his diocese. After the French Revolution and the occupation of Bergamo by the French Empire, Dolfin was one of the few bishops who did not try to prevent the seizure of church properties by the French. Dolfin died in 1819 when Bergamo was part of the Kingdom of Lombardy–Venetia.

See also 
Catholic Church in Italy

References

External links and additional sources
 (for Chronology of Bishops) 
 (for Chronology of Bishops) 

1736 births
1819 deaths
18th-century Roman Catholic bishops in the Republic of Venice
19th-century Italian Roman Catholic bishops
Bishops of Bergamo